Southside Elementary School may refer to:
 Southside Elementary School, Southside Alabama, Etowah County School District
 Southside Elementary School (Casa Grande, Arizona), one of Casa Grande's historic properties
Southside School (Miami, Florida), also known as "Southside Elementary School", listed on the National Register of Historic Places
 Southside Elementary School, Buffalo, New York, Buffalo Public Schools
 Southside Elementary School, Dinwiddie, Virginia, Dinwiddie County Public Schools